In sewing, a tuck is a fold or pleat in fabric that is sewn or fastened in place.

Small tucks, especially multiple parallel tucks, may be used to decorate clothing or household linens.  When the tucks are very narrow, they are called pintucks or Pin-tucking.

Tucks are also used to shorten a finished garment, especially a child's garment, so that it may be lengthened ("let down") as the child grows by removing the stitching holding the tuck in place.

In Louisa May Alcott's Little Women, Amy says:

Tucks, made easy with the invention of the sewing machine, were very popular as ornamentation in the latter half of the 19th century, especially in fine linen or cotton fabric for chemisettes, engageantes, blouses, lingerie, summer dresses, and children's garments.  Tucks were also used to decorate heavier fabrics: a travelling suit of "rough cheviot" (sturdy wool) is described as having its skirt "tucked, each tuck two inches wide and two inches apart, eight tucks in all, box-pleating at the bottom".

Gallery

Notes

References
 Cunnington, C. Willett: English Women's Clothing in the Nineteenth Century, Dover Publications reprint 1990, 0486263231
Picken, Mary Brooks: The Fashion Dictionary, Funk and Wagnalls, 1957.  (1973 edition )

Sewing